José Antonio Morales Ehrlich, also spelt Erlich (3 July 1935 – 26 June 2021), was a Salvadoran politician from the Christian Democratic Party who was a member of the Revolutionary Government Junta of El Salvador from 1980 to 1982. 

Morales Ehrlich died of natural causes at the age of 85 on 26 June 2021.

References 

1935 births
2021 deaths
Salvadoran politicians
People of the Salvadoran Civil War
Mayors of San Salvador
Christian Democratic Party (El Salvador) politicians
University of El Salvador alumni
People from Santa Ana, El Salvador